Shipmeadow is a village and civil parish located in the north of the English county of Suffolk.

At the 2011 United Kingdom census the parish had a population of 140. The parish council operates jointly with Barsham. The parishes share a village hall, but Shipmeadow has no services, with the parish church being sold for use as private housing in 1980.

The River Waveney runs to the north of the parish, with the northern section of the parish within the area of The Broads National Park. The parish borders the parishes of Mettingham, Barsham, Ilketshall St John and Ilketshall St Andrew. The Norfolk parishes of Ellingham and Geldeston border the parish on the northern bank of the Waveney.

History 
Shipmeadow is recorded in the Domesday Book of 1086 as Scitmetdua or Scipmedu. This settlement appears on John Speed's 1610 map as Shepemeadow. This shows that the name has more likely to be sheep meadow rather than the current Shipmeadow.

In the 1870s, John Marius Wilson made the following notes about Shipmeadow:'Shipmeadow, a parish, with a village, in Wangford district, Suffolk; 2½ miles W by S of Beccles r. station. It has a post-office under Beccles. The church was repaired in 1856. The Wangford workhouse is here, has accommodation for about 400 inmates.'

The workhouse remains, but has since been converted to residential use.

Transport 
The B1062 road runs through Shipmeadow, linking it to Beccles to the east and Bungay to the west. The A143 and A146 run to the north of the parish and provide routes to Norwich, Great Yarmouth and Lowestoft. The nearest railway station is at Beccles  to the east. The microairline Nebo Air intends to operate passenger flights from Shipmeadow Airfield to Damyns Hall Aerodrome near Upminster in East London and Wickenby Aerodrome in Lincolnshire using Pipistrel electrically powered light aircraft.

References

External links
Workhouse Chapel of St James, Shipmeadow Suffolk Churches

Villages in Suffolk
Civil parishes in Suffolk
Waveney District